Col du Grand Cucheron, at an elevation of , is a mountain pass in the Alps in the department of Savoie in France. The pass crosses the northern end of the Belledonne massif, connecting the Maurienne and Isère valleys. The climb to the col was used on Stage 12 of the 2012 Tour de France.

Cycle racing

Details of the climbs

This will be the direction from which the col is climbed in the  2012 Tour de France.

This route connects with that from La Corbière just after passing through Saint-Georges-des-Hurtières.

Appearances in Tour de France
The pass was first included in the Tour de France in 1972  and has since featured three times, most recently in 1998. It is generally ranked as a Category 2 climb. It was crossed on Stage 12 of the 2012 tour, between Saint-Jean-de-Maurienne and Annonay-Davézieux, approaching from the direction of Saint-Pierre-de-Belleville.

References

External links
 Col du Grand Cucheron cycling challenge
Col du Grand Cucheron on Google Maps (Tour de France classic climbs)

Mountain passes of Auvergne-Rhône-Alpes
Mountain passes of the Alps